The National Conservative Party of South Africa (Nasionale Konserwatiewe Party van Suid-Afrika in Afrikaans) is a nationalist political party formed on 16 April 2016 in Pretoria.

Formation

The party was formed on 16 April 2016 by a wide spectrum of conservative and nationalist South Africans, many of whom had been members of the Conservative Party in the 1980s. Steve Hofmeyr, an Afrikaans singer and activist, was the main guest speaker at the founding congress on 16 April 2016. The party was registered as a political party by the Independent Electoral Commission on 27 May 2016.

Ideology and policy 

The party was also formed on the principles of the Conservative Party of Andries Treurnicht but with a modern approach.

Afrikaner self-determination is the core policy of the party, but that does not exclude other people of European descent, such as British South Africans, Irish, Portuguese, Greeks, Poles and Italians. They also focus on the protection of Afrikaner rights in today's South Africa. The ultimate goal of the party is external self-determination or secession from South Africa.

The party did not take part in the 2019 national or provincial elections.

The party wants to use the Municipal Elections to win wards so they can be converted into new municipalities under section 235 of the Constitution of South Africa together with the Municipal Demarcation Act. The party is seeking affiliation to an international body of nationalist parties.

Events 

The party organised a memorial on Friday 20 May 2016 at the place of the Church Street bomb in Pretoria, a terrorist attack by the military-wing of the African National Congress, the Umkhonto we Sizwe on 20 May 1983. A memorial stone was placed at the scene in memory of the lives that were lost on that day.

In January 2019, leader Willie Cloete and a number of other members left to join Front National.

See also 
 Conservative Party (South Africa)
 Volkstaat
 Self-determination
 Afrikaner nationalism

References

External links 
National Conservative Party of South Africa Facebook

2016 establishments in South Africa
Afrikaner nationalism
Afrikaner organizations
Anti-communist parties
Boer nationalism
Conservative parties in South Africa
National conservative parties
Nationalist parties in South Africa
Paleoconservative parties
Political parties established in 2016
Political parties in South Africa
Political parties of minorities
Protestant political parties
Right-wing parties
Separatism in South Africa
White nationalist parties